Ferenc Szombathelyi (17 May 1887 – 4 November 1946), born Ferenc Knausz or Ferenc Knauz, was a Hungarian military officer who served, from September 1941 to April 1944, as Head of  the General Staff of the Royal Hungarian Army during World War II.

Military career
Szombathelyi joined the Austro-Hungarian army as a cadet in 1902 and was subsequently promoted to lieutenant in 1907 in the 16th Infantry Regiment. From 1911, he studied at the Kriegsschule (military academy) in Vienna. After participating in World War I he joined the newly founded Royal Hungarian Army.

From 1926 he taught at the Ludovica Military Academy in Budapest. From 1931-33, he was Chief of Staff of the 3rd Mixed Brigade, after which he served as adjutant of the high command of the armed forces in 1935–36. In 1938, he became the commander of the Ludovica Military Academy. From 1934 onward, he used his mother's maiden surname rather than his own given surname.

In 1938–39 he held the post of Deputy Chief of Staff. From 1939-41, he commanded the VIII Corps before he was appointed commanding general of the "Carpathian group" (Kárpát Csoport), with which he took part in Operation Barbarossa. On 6 September, he was appointed by Regent Miklós Horthy to succeed the pro-German Henrik Werth as Chief of General Staff. Szombathelyi assessed the prospects of war with the Soviet Union sceptically and did not hesitate to share this view with his German counterpart. Shortly after his appointment he was present at a meeting between Hitler and Horthy when the latter promised to provide more troops. 

He successfully delayed this measure until it could no longer be avoided following German Army setbacks in the winter of 1941-42 and the increased commitment of Romania. In April 1942, he sent the Second Army of Gusztáv Jány to the Eastern Front. Previously, in response to alleged attacks by communist partisans and Chetniks in the annexed Bácska, he ordered a military intervention by General Ferenc Feketehalmy-Czeydner, which evolved into punitive action against Serb-inhabited villages and culminated in the massacre of Újvidék (present-day Novi Sad).

In response to the catastrophic defeats of the second Army in the winter of 1942-43, Hungary increasingly tried to distance itself from its Axis partners. Szombathelyi's proposal to use Hungarian divisions to occupy the Balkans as a substitute for the failure of the second Army was welcomed by Hitler but rejected by Prime Minister Miklós Kállay. Contacts with the Western powers were initiated, with Kállay and Szombathelyi playing leading roles. 

After the German invasion of Hungary in March 1944, Szombathelyi was removed from office and placed under house arrest at German insistence, and retired in April. He was arrested in October 1944 after the Arrow Cross Party assumed power. Szombathelyi was deported to Germany toward the end of the war, then taken into custody by the Americans, who, however, turned him over to Hungary shortly thereafter. He was convicted by the Hungarian people's court to life imprisonment, then extradited to Yugoslavia. On 4 November 1946, in Petrovaradin (Hungarian: Pétervárad), Vojvodina, Szombathelyi was executed by a firing squad. Hungarian writer Tibor Cseres in his book "Vengeance in Bácska" states that Szombathelyi was impaled, but there is no conclusive evidence of this.

References

 FERENC SZOMBATHELYI – HEAD OF THE GENERAL STAFF OF THE HUNGARIAN ROYAL ARMY, Thesis of University Doctorate (PhD) Dissertation by József Kaló; accessed 24 January 2018.
 Földi Pál: A Magyar Királyi Honvédség a második világháborúban, Anno Kiadó, 2000; 
 Földi Pál: Horthy tábornokai, Anno Kiadó, 2007, Debrecen; 
 Dombrády Lóránd: Szombathelyi Ferenc a népbíróság előtt HM Hadtörténeti Intézet és Múzeum Line Design, 2007.
 Györkei Jenő: Idegen bírák előtt. Szombathelyi Ferenc újvidéki pere és kivégzése. Zrínyi Kiadó, Budapest, 2002.

1887 births
1946 deaths
People from Győr
Hungarian soldiers
Austro-Hungarian military personnel of World War I
Austro-Hungarian Army officers
Hungarian military personnel of World War II
Executed Hungarian people
People executed by Yugoslavia by hanging